Albane is a French feminine given name.

List of people with the given name 

 Albane Dubois (born 1992), French sailor
 Albane Gaillot (born 1971), French politician
 Albane Valenzuela (born 1997), American-French-Swiss Olympian golfer

See also 

 Alban (given name)
 Arbane, type of grape
 Albanese (surname)
 Albanel, Quebec
 Albania

French feminine given names